The Great North Run Cultural Programme, now known as Great North Run Culture, is an annual series of artistic commissions which celebrate and respond to the Great North Run - the world's largest half-marathon - its history and route, its spirit and recollection, the thousands of journeys and stories of those who take part.

Established in 2005 to celebrate the twenty fifth Great North Run, Great North Run Culture explores the partnership between art and sport. Commissions have included film, photography, music, dance, painting, drawing, writing and mass participation projects.

New work has been created by artists and creative practitioners including Jane and Louise Wilson, Michael Nyman, Fiona Banner, Bill Bryson, David Almond, Julian Germain, Graham Dolphin, Neville Campbell, Michael Baig-Clifford and Ravi Deepres, Iain Forsyth and Jane Pollard, Suky Best, James Edwards, Stephen Gill and Beat Streuli.

The Great North Run Moving Image Commission 

To celebrate the 25th anniversary of the Great North Run and to create a legacy from the first Cultural Programme film by Jane and Louise Wilson, an annual Moving Image Commission was launched, awarding an artist of film-maker £30,000 to create a new piece of work based on the Great North Run.

The films are premiered in North East England in September as part of the Great North Run Cultural Programme, with an extract screened on the BBC as part of their live coverage of the  Great North Run. There are plans to tour all of the works nationally and internationally from the end of 2008.

Previous Moving Image Commission Awards

2006:	Runner by Michael Baig-Clifford and Ravi Deepres

Selected by: artist Louise Wilson; Steven Bode, director of Film and Video Umbrella; Brendan Foster, chairman of the BUPA Great North Run; Beth Rowson, curator and manager of the Cultural Programme; Rebecca Shatwell, visual arts officer at Arts Council England.

2007:	About Running by Suky Best

Selected by: artist Mark Wallinger, Dave Gordon, head of special events at BBC Sport; Brendan Foster; Beth Rowson; Rebecca Shatwell

2008:   Run for me by Iain Forsyth and Jane Pollard

Selected by: artist Beat Streuli; Dave Gordon; Brendan Foster; Beth Rowson; Rebecca Shatwell

2009: Parade by Vicki Bennett (People Like Us)

Selected by: Amanda Ritson, visual arts officer at Arts Council England; Paul Bonaventura, senior research fellow in fine art studies at the University of Oxford; Beth Rowson, manager of the Cultural Programme

2010: Girl Blue Running Shoe by Claire Leona Apps

Selected by: Caroline Smith, arts consultant; Soraya Rodriguez, Director of Zoo Art Fair, Amanda Ritson and Beth Bate, director of Great North Run Culture.

2011: Run a Mile In My Shoes by David Blandy

Selected by: Godfrey Worsdale, director of Baltic; Alison Clark-Jenkins, director of Arts Council England North East; artist Simon Pope and Beth Bate.

2012: "The Order of Things" by Karin Kihlberg and Reuben Henry

Selected by: Jon Bewley, director of Locus+; Alison Clark-Jenkins, director of Arts Council England North East; artist Graham Gusssin; and Beth Bate.

2013: "Tracer" by Melanie Manchot

Selected by: Alice Sharp of Invisible Dust; Judith King of Arts and Heritage; artist Matt Stokes; and Beth Bate.

External links 

Great North Run Culture
Great North Run Moving Image Commission webpage: Great North Run Moving Image Commission

North East England